Green Guitar Blues is an album by jazz guitarist Bucky Pizzarelli that was released in 1972 by Monmouth Green.

Reception

At AllMusic, critic Scott Yanow called the album "quite enjoyable" and "melodic and concise versions of a variety of songs that Pizzarelli enjoys, including swing standards, two originals, a few medleys and a couple of classical numbers." Yanow also notes a "particular highlight is the Dick McDonough-Carl Kress piece 'Chicken a La Swing', which Bucky plays in a guitar duet with his 14-year-old daughter Mary Pizzarelli."

Track listing

Personnel
 Bucky Pizzarelli – guitar
 Mary Pizzarelli – guitar
 George Duvivier – double bass
 Don Lamond – drums

References

1972 albums
Bucky Pizzarelli albums